The Writers Guild of America is the joint efforts of two different US labor unions representing TV and film writers:  
 The Writers Guild of America, East (WGAE), headquartered in New York City and affiliated with the AFL–CIO
 The Writers Guild of America West (WGAW), headquartered in Los Angeles.

Common activities
The WGAE and WGAW negotiate contracts in unison as well as launch strike actions simultaneously.

 1960 Writers Guild of America strike
 1981 Writers Guild of America strike
 1985 Writers Guild of America strike
 1988 Writers Guild of America strike
 2007–08 Writers Guild of America strike
 Effect of the 2007–2008 Writers Guild of America strike on television, a list of television shows affected by the strike

Although each Guild runs independently, they perform some activities in parallel:
 Writers Guild of America Awards, an annual awards show with simultaneous presentations on each coast
 WGA screenwriting credit system, determines how writers' names are listed during the credits
 WGA script registration service, online services to prove when scripts were written and by whom
 International Affiliation of Writers Guilds (IAWG), both Guilds belong to this international labor federation

See also
 National Writers Union

External links 

 Writers Guild of America West Website
 Writers Guild of America, East Website